The 1994–95 Slovenian Basketball League was the fourth season of the Premier A Slovenian Basketball League, the highest professional basketball league in Slovenia.

Regular season

P=Matches played, W=Matches won, L=Matches lost, F=Points for, A=Points against, Pts=Points

Champions standings

P=Matches played, W=Matches won, L=Matches lost, F=Points for, A=Points against, Pts=Points

Playoffs

External links
Official Basketball Federation of Slovenia website 

Slovenian Basketball League seasons
Slovenia
1994–95 in Slovenian basketball